Mariano Zabaleta was the defending champion, and defended his title defeating Gastón Gaudio 6–1, 4–6, 7–6(7–4) in the final.

Seeds

Draw

Finals

Top half

Bottom half

References

External links
 Main draw
 Qualifying draw

Swedish Open
2004 ATP Tour
Swedish